Lukky Tedjamukti (born 12 June 1967) is an Indonesian former professional tennis player.

She made her debut as a professional in March 1989, aged 21, at an ITF tournament in Jakarta. Tedjamukti has won two doubles titles on the ITF Women's Circuit. On 30 September 1991, she reached her best singles ranking of world No. 418. On 23 September 1991, she peaked at No. 314 in the WTA doubles rankings. In 1985, she played in the Wimbledon Junior Championships doubles and singles competitions, but lost both matches.

She was part of Indonesia's Fed Cup team in 1985, 1989, and 1990. Playing for Indonesia at the Fed Cup, Tedjamukti has accumulated a win–loss record of 2–3.

At the 1990 Asian Games at Beijing, Tedjamukti won the bronze medal in the Women's Doubles competition, partnered by Irawati Moerid.

ITF Finals

Doubles (2–3)

External links

Indonesian female tennis players
1967 births
Living people
Asian Games medalists in tennis
Indonesian people of Chinese descent
Tennis players at the 1990 Asian Games
Asian Games silver medalists for Indonesia
Asian Games bronze medalists for Indonesia
Medalists at the 1990 Asian Games
Southeast Asian Games gold medalists for Indonesia
Southeast Asian Games bronze medalists for Indonesia
Southeast Asian Games medalists in tennis
Competitors at the 1985 Southeast Asian Games
20th-century Indonesian women